Elections to Ards Borough Council were held on 5 May 2011 on the same day as the other Northern Irish local government elections. The election used four district electoral areas to elect a total of 23 councillors.

Election results

Note: "Votes" are the first preference votes.

Districts summary

|- class="unsortable" align="centre"
!rowspan=2 align="left"|Ward
! % 
!Cllrs
! % 
!Cllrs
! %
!Cllrs
! %
!Cllrs
! %
!Cllrs
!rowspan=2|TotalCllrs
|- class="unsortable" align="center"
!colspan=2 bgcolor="" | DUP
!colspan=2 bgcolor="" | UUP
!colspan=2 bgcolor="" | Alliance
!colspan=2 bgcolor="" | SDLP
!colspan=2 bgcolor="white"| Others
|-
|align="left"|Ards East
|bgcolor="#D46A4C"|57.6
|bgcolor="#D46A4C"|4
|17.0
|1
|16.2
|1
|1.8
|0
|7.4
|0
|6
|-
|align="left"|Ards West
|bgcolor="#D46A4C"|52.4
|bgcolor="#D46A4C"|3
|20.6
|2
|19.8
|1
|0.0
|0
|7.2
|0
|6
|-
|align="left"|Newtownards
|bgcolor="#D46A4C"|40.9
|bgcolor="#D46A4C"|2
|20.9
|2
|16.5
|1
|1.7
|0
|20.0
|1
|6
|-
|align="left"|Peninsula
|bgcolor="#D46A4C"|36.4
|bgcolor="#D46A4C"|2
|11.8
|1
|20.2
|1
|24.2
|1
|7.4
|0
|5
|- class="unsortable" class="sortbottom" style="background:#C9C9C9"
|align="left"| Total
|47.4
|11
|17.5
|6
|18.2
|4
|6.8
|1
|10.1
|1
|23
|-
|}

Districts results

Ards East

2005: 4 x DUP, 2 x UUP
2011: 4 x DUP, 1 x UUP, 1 x Alliance
2005-2011 Change: Alliance gain from UUP

Ards West

2005: 3 x DUP, 2 x UUP, 1 x Alliance
2011: 3 x DUP, 2 x UUP, 1 x Alliance
2005-2011 Change: No change

Newtownards

2005: 3 x DUP, 2 x UUP, 1 x Alliance
2011: 2 x DUP, 2 x UUP, 1 x Alliance, 1 x Independent
2005-2011 Change: Independent gain from DUP

Peninsula

2005: 2 x DUP, 1 x SDLP, 1 x Alliance, 1 x UUP
2011: 2 x DUP, 1 x SDLP, 1 x Alliance, 1 x UUP
2005-2011 Change: No change

References

Ards Borough Council elections
Ards